The 1922 Maryland Aggies football team was an American football team that represented the University of Maryland in the Southern Conference (SoCon) during the 1922 college football season. In their 12th season under head coach Curley Byrd, the Aggies compiled a 4–5–1 record (1–2 against SoCon opponents), finished in a five-way tie for 11th place in the conference, and were outscored by a total of 137 to 77.

Schedule

References

Maryland
Maryland Terrapins football seasons
Maryland Aggies football